Andrew George Grahame (born 10 September 1957 in Birmingham, England) is a former Speedway rider. 

He won the British Speedway Championship in 1982. He also made it to the World Final in 1982 in Los Angeles as reserve but did not ride. He was signed to ride for the Oxford Cheetahs team in 1985 and was part of the title winning team in both 1985, 1986 and 1989.  

His brother Alan Grahame also rode for the Oxford Cheetahs in 1993 and 1994 and both rode together for the Cradley Heathens in 2009.

Andy's image is depicted on Proof of Youth an album released in 2007 by the Brighton band The Go! Team.

World Final Appearances
 1982 -  Los Angeles, Memorial Coliseum - Reserve - did not ride

References

1957 births
Living people
British speedway riders
English motorcycle racers
British Speedway Championship winners
Wolverhampton Wolves riders
Birmingham Brummies riders
Cradley Heathens riders
Oxford Cheetahs riders
Wimbledon Dons riders
Eastbourne Eagles riders
Milton Keynes Knights riders
Sportspeople from Birmingham, West Midlands